The discography of the Eurovision Song Contest winners includes all the winning singles of the annual competition held since 1956.

1956–1969

1970–1989

1990–2009

2010–2019

2020–present

See also
 List of Eurovision Song Contest winners

References

Discographies